Alan Rhun Watkins (3 April 1933 – 8 May 2010) was for over 50 years a British political columnist in various London-based magazines and newspapers. He also wrote about wine and rugby.

Life and career
Alan Watkins was born in Tycroes, Carmarthenshire, to David John Watkins (1894–1980), a teacher (sometime headmaster at Llanedi School, near Tycroes), from a mining family, and Violet, also a teacher, daughter of Dr Edwin Harris, a GP. He was educated at Tycroes Primary School and Amman Valley Grammar School before studying law at Queens' College, Cambridge. After National Service, he was called to the Bar.

Much of his long career as a commentator on politics was spent at The Observer newspaper (1976–93), but he also wrote for The Sunday Express (1959–64), The Spectator (1964–67), the New Statesman (1967–76), the Sunday Mirror, and the London Evening Standard.

At the end of each year he wrote a piece called "Master Alan Watkins' Almanack", written in the style of a 17th-century seer and making tentative, and slightly tongue-in-cheek, predictions for the year ahead.

Political language 
He coined and popularised a number of phrases that have passed into common journalistic parlance, including "chattering classes"; although he fleshed out the archetypal "young fogey" in The Spectator in 1984, Watkins noted that he had adopted the phrase from the journalist Terence Kilmartin, who had used it in reference to the academic John Casey, and Watkins stated that the phrase originated with Dornford Yates in 1928.

He was noted for coining the political phrase "the men in grey suits", indicating a delegation of senior party figures (such as the Conservative Party's 1922 Committee) who come to tell a party leader that it is time to go. But as he wrote in a footnote in A Conservative Coup:

The original phrase was 'the men in suits'. It was used, for example, by the present writer in the Observer, 6 May 1990. During and before the 39 hours it became transformed into 'the men in grey suits', which stuck. As Lord Whitelaw observed on television, it was an inaccurate phrase, because on the day in question, 21 November, his interviewer could see that he was wearing a blue suit. And, indeed, the typical Conservative grandee tends to wear a dark blue or black suit, with chalk- or pin-stripes, what may be called a White's Club suit. The original phrase 'the men in suits' is the more accurate.

Death
Watkins was in failing health for several weeks prior to his death at his London home on 8 May 2010 from renal failure, aged 77. He was buried on the eastern side of Highgate Cemetery.

Bibliography

Books
 
 Watkins, Alan (1990) A Slight Case of Libel: Meacher Versus Trelford and Others, London: Duckworth 
 Watkins, Alan (1991) A Conservative Coup: The Fall of Margaret Thatcher, London: Duckworth 
 Watkins, Alan (1998) The Road to Number 10: From Bonar Law to Tony Blair, London: Duckworth 
 Watkins, Alan (2001) A Short Walk Down Fleet Street: From Beaverbrook to Boycott, London: Duckworth

Articles

References

External links 
Master Alan Watkins' Almanack Jan-2006: Master Cameron may decide his Interest is best serv'd if Master Blair stays put
Master Alan Watkins' Almanack Dec-2006: Master Blair has a clever Scheam. He is desirous to make Peace with Mr Brown
 

1933 births
2010 deaths
Burials at Highgate Cemetery
Welsh-speaking journalists
Alumni of Queens' College, Cambridge
British male journalists
Deaths from kidney failure
People from Carmarthenshire
Welsh journalists